The Cyrus Fogg Brackett Chair of Physics is an endowed professorship established at Princeton University in 1927 by a donation from Thomas D. Jones in honor of Cyrus Fogg Brackett (1833–1915), who was a professor of physics at Princeton University and founder of Princeton University's electrical engineering department.

Endowment
In a January 1927 letter to Princeton University's President John Grier Hibben, Thomas D. Jones wrote:

Thomas D. Jones and his older brother David B. Jones were Princeton graduates, who became wealthy lawyers in Chicago and trustees of Princeton University.

Thomas Jones donated in 1928 $100,000 to Princeton University's Alumni Fund for Faculty Salaries and in his will bequeathed $500,000 for faculty salaries at Princeton University.

History
The chair's first incumbent was Karl Taylor Compton (who received his Ph.D. from Princeton in 1912 and won the 1931 Rumford Prize). Princeton University in 1927 appointed him Director of Research at the Palmer Laboratory and Cyrus Fogg Brackett professor, but he resigned in 1930 to become the president of Massachusetts Institute of Technology.

Perhaps the most controversial holder of the professorship was William Happer, who received many honors and awards, including 1996 election to membership in the National Academy of Sciences and the 2000 Davisson-Germer Prize. According to New York Times reporter Lisa Friedman, Dr. Happer "gained notoriety for claiming that the greenhouse gases contributing to warming the planet are beneficial to humanity" and, in a 2014 interview, for comparing efforts to curb fossil fuels to "the demonization of the poor Jews under Hitler".

Recipients
Holders of the Cyrus Fogg Brackett Chair have been:
 Karl Taylor Compton (1927–1930)
 Rudolf Ladenburg (1930–1950)
 Walker Bleakney (1953–?)
 Robert H. Dicke (1957–1975)
 Val Logsdon Fitch (1976–1982)
 David Todd Wilkinson (?–2002)
 William Happer (2003–2014)
 Lyman Page (2014–2015)

References

Professorships in physics
Professorships at Princeton University
1927 establishments in New Jersey